José Carlos da Silva or simply Carlinhos Bala (born September 17, 1979 in Recife), is a Brazilian striker. He retired in 2012 at CRB.

Honours
 Campeonato Pernambucano in 2005 and 2012 with Santa Cruz Futebol Clube
 Campeonato Pernambucano in 2007 and 2008 with Sport Club do Recife
 Copa do Brasil in 2008 with Sport Club do Recife

Individual
Thai League 1 MVP: 2004–05
 Campeonato Pernambucano Top Scorer in 2005

Personal life
He is a devout evangelical Christian, having converted after his retirement from football.

External links
 CBF
 sambafoot
 zerozero.pt

References

1979 births
Living people
Brazilian footballers
S.C. Beira-Mar players
Santa Cruz Futebol Clube players
Clube Náutico Capibaribe players
Cruzeiro Esporte Clube players
Sport Club do Recife players
Atlético Clube Goianiense players
Fortaleza Esporte Clube players
Clube de Regatas Brasil players
Campeonato Brasileiro Série A players
Converts to evangelical Christianity
Brazilian evangelicals
Sportspeople from Recife
Association football forwards